Torngat is the first album of the Montreal-based instrumental act Torngat.

Track listing
  "32 mm"
  "Three Frozen Birds"
  "Long stick"
  "Lady Grey"
  "Sadly Looking at an Immersed Dying Eider"
  "Resurfacing"
  "Space"
  "Drop the Bomb"
  "New Groove"
 "Ukumama"
 "Backpain"
 "Sparks Like a Song"
 "Hate to Say I Told You So"
 "Angels Try"

2002 debut albums
Torngat albums